Vasyl Chornyi (born October 3, 1987) is a Ukrainian footballer playing with FC Ukraine United in the Ontario Soccer League.

Career 
Chornyi began his career in 2005 with Nyva Ternopil in the Ukrainian Second League. The following year he played in the Ukrainian Amateur Football Championship with Ternopil-Burevisnyk, where he won the Championship of the Ternopil Oblast. In 2009, he returned to Nyva Ternopil to play in the Ukrainian First League, and at the conclusion of the season he returned to Ternopil-Burevisnyk. During his second term in the Ternopil Oblast amateur league he won the Ternopil Oblast championship, and the Ternopil Oblast Cup Winners. 

In 2012, he returned to the Ukrainian Second League after securing a promotion, and followed by another promotion in 2014 to the Ukrainian First League. In 2017, he played abroad in the Canadian Soccer League with FC Ukraine United, and clinched the CSL Second Division Championship. While in his second year he assisted in securing the First Division title. He played in the Ontario Soccer League in 2021 with Ukraine United.

References 

1987 births
Living people
Ukrainian footballers
FC Nyva Ternopil players
FC Ternopil players
FC Ukraine United players
Canadian Soccer League (1998–present) players
Association football midfielders
Ukrainian First League players
Ukrainian expatriate footballers
Expatriate soccer players in Canada
Ukrainian Second League players